List of Scream characters can refer to:

 List of Scream (film series) characters
 List of Scream (TV series) characters

Lists of fictional characters